Altica ericeti (Altica sandini) is a species of leaf beetles in the family Chrysomelidae. It can be found in the Iberian Peninsula, France, England, West Germany, Netherlands, Morocco.

References

Beetles described in 1859
Alticini
Beetles of Europe